The Stump Formation is a geologic formation in Utah and Wyoming. It preserves fossils dating back to the Jurassic period.

See also

 List of fossiliferous stratigraphic units in Utah
 Paleontology in Utah

References
 

Jurassic geology of Utah